MS The World is a private residential cruise ship operated like a condominium complex, with large apartments that can be purchased. The residents, from many countries, can live on board as the ship travels. Some residents choose to live on board full-time while others visit periodically throughout the year. The ship is operated by ROW Management, Ltd., headquartered in Fort Lauderdale, Florida, United States.

The ship has 165 residences (106 apartments, 19 studio apartments, and 40 studios), all owned by the ship's residents. Average occupancy is 150–200 residents and guests.

The World is registered in The Bahamas and has a gross tonnage of 43,188. The crew numbers approximately 280.

 The World holds the world record for the southernmost ship voyage, achieved by her Captain Dag H. Sævik and the 63 residents on board at the time as well as crewmembers. The ship reached 78°43•997´S and 163°41•421´W at the Bay of Whales in Antarctica’s Ross Sea.

In March 2020 the ship was emptied of passengers and non-essential crew because of concerns about the COVID-19 pandemic. The World returned to service in July 2021.

Several other residence cruise ships are under construction or planned, including Utopia,  Njord,  Dark Island  and Narrative.

Original concept and construction 

The ship was the idea of Knut Kloster, whose family had a long history in the marine industry. The hull was built in Landskrona, Sweden, by Öresundsvarvet, and it was then towed to Fosen Mekaniske Verksted in Rissa, Norway, for completion. The vessel was launched in March 2002 and purchased by its residents in October 2003.

The management company is responsible for operations and administration of the ship, including hiring the employees. The residents, through their elected board of directors and a network of committees, provide guidance to the management about the ship's itinerary, finances, and lifestyle.

Facilities 
The ship has a large lobby, deli and grocery store, a boutique, fitness center, billiard room, golf simulator and putting greens, tennis court, jogging track, spa, swimming pool, and cocktail lounges.

There are six restaurants for dining that supplement the kitchens or kitchenettes in most of the residences. For on-board entertainment there is a movie theater, library and music performances. In addition to shore excursions, various classes have been offered on board. The World provides internet access in each residence.

Northwest Passage transits 

Setting sail from Nome, Alaska, U.S. on 18 August 2012 and reaching Nuuk, Greenland on 12 September 2012, The World became the largest passenger vessel at the time to transit the Northwest Passage. In 2019, the ship traversed the Passage from east to west, becoming the 300th vessel to make the voyage, and the largest to do so in both directions.

COVID-19 

In March 2020 the ship unloaded all passengers and non-essential crew because of concern about COVID-19 infection.

In April 2020, the ship was asked to leave the port of Fremantle, Australia.  The government of New Zealand received a request to let the ship shelter in a local port.  This request was denied, as New Zealand had banned cruise ships (and non-New Zealand residents) from entering the country.  In 2020, the ship was in lay-berth in Falmouth, United Kingdom. and Santa Cruz de Tenerife, Spain, before returning to service in July 2021.

See also 
 Seasteading, the concept of creating permanent dwellings at sea

References

External links 

 
 The World at marinetraffic.com including the current ship position via Automatic Identification System (AIS)
 
 The World - O navio residencial mais luxuoso do mundo 

ResidenSea
Cruise ships
2001 ships
Ships built in Rissa, Norway
Ships built in Landskrona